Martin's Tavern is the oldest family-owned restaurant in Washington, D.C., founded in 1933 in Georgetown. Martin's Tavern was founded by former Major League Baseball player William Gloyd "Billy" Martin. The tavern has hosted each U.S. President from Harry S. Truman to George W. Bush.  Martin's is located at 1264 Wisconsin Avenue, NW in the Georgetown neighborhood of Washington D.C.
It was at Martin's Tavern on June 24, 1953, that Senator John F. Kennedy proposed marriage to Jacqueline Lee Bouvier.

In April 2020, Martin's Tavern appeared on the Cooking Channel show Man v. Food in a Washington, D.C.-based episode.

External links
 Martin's Tavern official site

References

Georgetown (Washington, D.C.)
Restaurants in Washington, D.C.
Restaurants established in 1933
1933 establishments in Washington, D.C.